is a Japanese actress.

Career
Sato appeared in Sion Sono's 2007 thriller film Exte. She played a supporting role in Mikio Satake's 2008 debut film Class Reunion.

Filmography

Films
 Winning Pass (2004)
 Angel in the Box (2004)
 Peanuts (2006)
 Angel (2006)
 Green Mind, Metal Bats (2006)
 Exte (2007) as Yuki Morita
 Cyborg She (2008)
 L: Change the WorLd (2008) as Misawa Hatsune
 Kung Fu Kun (2008)
 Hana Yori Dango Final (2008)
 Class Reunion (2008) as Megumi
 Happy Flight (2008)
 Kamogawa Horumo (2009)
 Kamisama Help! (2010)
 After the Flowers (2010)
 Milocrorze (2011)
 The Castle of Crossed Destinies (2012)
 Sue, Mai & Sawa: Righting the Girl Ship (2013)
 The Complex (2013)

Television
 Kinpachi-sensei (2001)
 Medaka (2004)
 H2 (2005) as Satomi Nakata
 Hana Yori Dango (2005) as Sakurako Sanjo
 Aru Ai no Uta (2006) as Shiami Shirai
 Sunadokei (2007) as Ann Minase
 Taiyo no Uta (2006) as Misaki Matsumae
 Chiritotechin (2007) as Kiyomi Wada
 Hana Yori Dango Returns (2007) as Sakurako Sanjo
 Shukujo (2008)
 The Hippocratic Oath (2016)
 Lost Man Found (2022)

References

External links
 
 

1984 births
Actresses from Tokyo
Japanese film actresses
Japanese television actresses
Japanese voice actresses
Japanese idols
Living people
Stardust Promotion artists
21st-century Japanese actresses